Braník (sometimes inaccurately called Bráník) is a district in Prague located in the south of the city, on the east bank of the Vltava. It used to be known for its brewery, but the brewery is now out of business as it ceased operations in 2002. Braník borders with Malá Chuchle and Hlubočepy in the west, Podolí in the north, Krč in the east and Lhotka and Hodkovičky in the south.

References 

Districts of Prague